Zygaena tamara is a species of moth in the Zygaenidae family. It is found in Zangazur və Daralayaz .

Description
In Seitz it is described -  Z. tamara Christ. (7b) . One of the finest Zygaenae. All the wings bright yellow, with a delicate rosy tint, the distal margin being black; forewing divided by 2 black transverse bands into 3 areas of nearly equal size. Antenna exceedingly long and strong, the abdomen being broadly belted with red. — ab. rubra Bang-Haas i. l. (7b) the hindwing is rosy red instead of yellow, while in the form daemon Christ. (7 b) the fore- and hindwing are red. All 3 forms occur together in Armenia, but are found only in limited districts.

Biology
The larval foodplants are Eryngium billardieri , Eryngium giganteum, Prangos sp. and Ferula haussknechtii

Subspecies
Z. t. tamara
Z. t. mahabadica Reiss, 1978
Z. t. kerendica Reiss, 1978
''Z. t. bijarica (Reiss, 1978)

References

External links
Images representing Zygaena tamara at Bold

Moths described in 1889
Zygaena